Maury Harris is a managing director and chief economist for the Americas for UBS. Harris was named among the 2012 Bloomberg 50 Most Influential people in global finance.

Education
Harris graduated Phi Beta Kappa from University of Texas, and has  a PhD in economics from Columbia University.

Personal life
Harris is married with two children.

References

External links
Maury Harris bloomberg.com

Living people
21st-century American economists
Columbia Graduate School of Arts and Sciences alumni
University of Texas alumni
Year of birth missing (living people)